Yevgeny Polonsky, also known as M. L. Polonsky, was a Ukrainian soldier in the Red Army and the leader of a Bolshevik conspiracy to overthrow the Makhnovshchina.

Biography
He was born in Berdiansk, the son of a fisherman. During World War I, he was drafted into the Black Sea Fleet. Following the 1917 Revolution, he briefly joined the Left Socialist-Revolutionaries, before signing up with the Communist Party in early 1918.

After serving on the revolutionary committee of Huliaipole, he joined the Makhnovist movement and became a regimental commander following the battle of Dibrivka. But in August 1919, after the Red Army fled Ukraine, he joined up with the Revolutionary Insurgent Army, along with most of his division. Here, he came to command the 3rd Crimean Regiment, which eventually changed its name to the "Iron Regiment".

When the insurgents captured most of southern Ukraine, Polonsky became part of the Bolshevik underground, which aimed to subvert the influence of the anarchists. While on his way to attend the Fourth Regional Congress in Oleksandrivsk, Polonsky attended a communist meeting, in which he agreed to lead his unit in a coup d'etat against the insurgent high command. He helped to finance the plot and sent his adjutant to coordinate with the Bolshevik leadership in Moscow.

As part of the plan to install Bolsheviks in positions of command within the Insurgent Army, by 18 October, Polonsky had recruited a number of insurgent commanders into the conspiracy. Polonsky even rose to the rank of commander of the Nikopol Military District, but he was dismissed by November, due to his spreading of Bolshevik propaganda. He subsequently moved to the insurgent headquarters of Katerynoslav, where he claimed to be seeking medical treatment. Once in the city, he began plotting to poison Nestor Makhno and other members of the insurgent high command, even bribing doctors into poisoning insurgent commanders that were sick with typhus.

On 2 December 1919, Polonsky attended a meeting with the Central Committee of the Communist Party of Ukraine, in which the conspirators laid out their plans for Makhno's assassination. They planned to lure the high command from a conference to Polonsky's apartment, claiming it to be a party celebrating his wife's birthday. Polonsky's wife Tatyana was even to play a direct role in the assassination, using her skill as a professional actor to poison Makhno himself. But when the plan was carried out, Polonsky's apartment was stormed by the Kontrrazvedka, who arrested the couple, along with three other conspirators.

Polonsky and his co-conspirators were found guilty of conspiracy and sentenced to execution by firing squad. Makhno even accused Polonsky of treason, for having allegedly handed passwords to the units of Yakov Slashchov. On 5 December 1919, the five conspirators were led to the banks of the Dnieper, where they were shot by Semen Karetnyk, Aleksandr Lepechenko and Hryhory Vasylivsky.

References

Bibliography
 
 
 

 
 

1919 deaths
Communist Party of Ukraine (Soviet Union) politicians
Deaths by firearm in Ukraine
Double agents
Executed Ukrainian people
Failed assassins
Makhnovshchina
People executed by firing squad
People executed for mutiny
People from Berdiansk
Soviet people of the Ukrainian–Soviet War
Ukrainian people of World War I
Ukrainian revolutionaries
Year of birth unknown